Jean-François Larios (born 27 August 1956) is a French former professional football midfielder. He earned seventeen international caps (five goals) for the France national team during the late 1970s and early 1980s.

A player of Saint-Étienne, Larios was a member of the French squad in the 1982 World Cup. However, he played only two matches after rumours surfaced that he was having an affair with Michel Platini's wife. In 1983 Larios became one of the very few French players to appear in the North American Soccer League when he joined the Montreal Manic.

References

External links
NASL stats

1956 births
Living people
Pieds-Noirs
Sportspeople from Pau, Pyrénées-Atlantiques
French footballers
French expatriate footballers
Association football midfielders
France international footballers
French people of Spanish descent
AS Saint-Étienne players
SC Bastia players
Atlético Madrid footballers
Olympique Lyonnais players
RC Strasbourg Alsace players
OGC Nice players
Montpellier HSC players
Neuchâtel Xamax FCS players
Ligue 1 players
Ligue 2 players
1982 FIFA World Cup players
People from Sidi Bel Abbès
Montreal Manic players
French expatriate sportspeople in Canada
Expatriate soccer players in Canada
French expatriate sportspeople in Switzerland
Expatriate footballers in Switzerland
North American Soccer League (1968–1984) players
Swiss Super League players
Footballers from Nouvelle-Aquitaine